Hildor Lundvik (Gävle, 6 March 1885 – Stockholm, 24 January 1951) was a Swedish musician and composer. He first studied law at Uppsala University, then music at the Royal Swedish Academy of Music in Stockholm, graduating as a music teacher in 1912, as precentor and organist (Västerås) in 1919 and singing teacher in 1913. He became organist of St Göran, Stockholm, 1928, directed the Bellman Male-Choir from 1930 to 1950, and was Principal Conductor of the Stockholm Federation of Male Voice Choirs.

Hildor Lundvik’s main achievement as a composer was in the field of vocal music, although he also produced a small number of short orchestral works (Liten svit and Två elegiska melodier) and various piano compositions. His choral songs Som ett blommande mandelträd and Det första vårregnet (both 1932) and Verlaine-stämning (1937) have stood the test of time with their natural freshness unimpaired. His cantata Sången, a succession of male voice quartets and several solo songs are also memorable. Lundvik wrote in a fairly romantic, lyrical style, using vivid impressionist tone colouring.

He was married to Johanna Magdalena Näsman.

References 

1885 births
1951 deaths
20th-century classical composers
Swedish classical composers
Swedish male classical composers
Swedish classical organists
Male classical organists
20th-century organists
20th-century Swedish male musicians
20th-century Swedish musicians